Robert Capperauld (died 14 July 1915) was a Scottish professional footballer who made one appearance as a goalkeeper in the Scottish League for Ayr.

Personal life 
Capperauld served as a private in the Royal Scots Fusiliers during the First World War and died of a shrapnel wound to the right shoulder at a casualty clearing station on 'W' Beach, Cape Helles, on 14 July 1915. He was buried in Lancashire Landing Cemetery.

Career statistics

References

Scottish footballers
Scottish Football League players
1915 deaths
Year of birth missing
Footballers from Ayr
Association football goalkeepers
Ayr Parkhouse F.C. players
Ayr F.C. players
Ayr United F.C. players
British military personnel killed in World War I
British Army personnel of World War I
Royal Scots Fusiliers soldiers
Burials at Lancashire Landing Commonwealth War Graves Commission Cemetery